Öztürkçe refers to a purist form of Turkish, which is largely free of Persian and Arab influences. Öztürkçe was an active target of the Turkish language reform. This language policy of Turkification was enforced by the written reform and from 1932 by the Turkish Language Association (TDK). The TDK collected for this purpose Turkic wordings in historical sources and Anatolian dialects. On this basis, the TDK formed a large number of neologisms that were disseminated using media and textbooks. In 1937, Atatürk himself anonymously wrote a geometry book for students with special terms chosen by him, which are still in use today. From the 1940s, the TDK developed normative dictionaries (Türkçe Sözlük) and spelling guides (Yazım kılavuzu).

The use of Öztürkçe was and is an indicator for the world view of Kemalism. For several decades, no active policy of voice control is taking place.

See also
Replacement of loanwords in Turkish
Linguistic purism

References

Linguistic purism
Turkish language
Turkish nationalism